Below are current ambassadors of the European Union to non-EU countries and international organizations. They are also known as delegation heads or envoys. 
Prior to the Treaty of Lisbon, the EU was represented abroad by the Ambassador of the country holding the semestral EU presidency, and the European Commission was represented by a Head of Delegation of the European Commission, member of the diplomatic corps and given the title of ambassador as a courtesy.

Since 2010, the Ambassador of the European Union, now officially accredited as Ambassador Extraordinary and Plenipotentiary, is appointed by the President of the European Council and the President of the European Commission, following a proposal by the High Representative of the Union for Foreign Affairs and Security Policy. They are chosen among candidates coming from the European External Action Service (EEAS), the European Commission, the European Council and the 27 Ministries of Foreign Affairs of the member states.

Current ambassadors

Ambassadors to non-EU countries

Ambassadors to international organisations

See also
 Accreditations and Responsibilities of EU delegations
 European External Action Service
 European Union and the United Nations
 European Union Special Representative
 Foreign relations of the European Union
 List of diplomatic missions of the European Union

References

External links
 
 EU Delegations Worldwide

 
Political offices of the European Union
Foreign relations of the European Union
 
European Union